Hanadan (also Romanized as Ḩanādān; also known as Ḩanādāneh and Hanādūn) is a village in Dezhgan Rural District, in the Central District of Bandar Lengeh County, Hormozgan Province, Iran. At the 2006 census, its population was 96, in 20 families.

References 

Populated places in Bandar Lengeh County